One Step Forward (Spanish: Un paso al frente) is a 1960 Spanish comedy film directed by Ramón Torrado.

Cast
 Manolita Barroso 
 Tomás Blanco 
 Xan das Bolas 
 José Campos 
 Germán Cobos 
 Rosario Maldonado 
 Alfredo Mayo 
 Antonio Molino Rojo
 José Nieto 
 Julio Núñez 
 María del Valle 
 Ángel Álvarez

References

Bibliography 
 Francesc Llinàs. Directores de fotografía del cine español. Filmoteca Española, 1989.

External links 
 

1960 comedy films
Spanish comedy films
1960 films
1960s Spanish-language films
Films directed by Ramón Torrado
1960s Spanish films